Rogério Moraes Ferreira (born 11 January 1994) is a Brazilian handball player who plays for MT Melsungen and the Brazilian national team.

Honours
Benfica
EHF European League: 2021–22
Individual
2022 South and Central American Men's Handball Championship: Best pivot

References

External links
Џиновски пивот од Кил го засилува Вардар!

1994 births
Living people
Brazilian male handball players
Sportspeople from Belém
Expatriate handball players
Brazilian expatriate sportspeople in Germany
Brazilian expatriate sportspeople in Spain
Brazilian expatriate sportspeople in North Macedonia
Handball-Bundesliga players
Liga ASOBAL players
THW Kiel players
South American Games gold medalists for Brazil
South American Games medalists in handball
Competitors at the 2018 South American Games
Pan American Games medalists in handball
Pan American Games bronze medalists for Brazil
Handball players at the 2019 Pan American Games
Medalists at the 2019 Pan American Games
Handball players at the 2020 Summer Olympics
20th-century Brazilian people
21st-century Brazilian people